Coke Boys 3: Niggas Wit Coke (or simply Coke Boys 3) is a mixtape by American hip hop group Coke Boys, released on April 13, 2012. The mixtape features appearances from members signed to the Coke Boys Records label including Chinx Drugz, Charlie Rock, Cheeze, and Flip, alongside guest appearances from Rick Ross, Akon, Mac Miller, Wale, Red Café, Stack Bundles, and other rappers.

Track listing

References

2012 mixtape albums
Albums produced by Harry Fraud
Albums produced by Honorable C.N.O.T.E.[king drakko]

Albums produced by Lex Luger
Albums produced by Akon
Albums produced by Aone
Albums produced by the Heatmakerz
Sequel albums